Dhanush M. Kumar is an Indian politician and member of the 17th Lok Sabha, representing Tenkasi constituency, Tamil Nadu. He is a member of the Dravida Munnetra Kazhagam.

References 

India MPs 2019–present
Lok Sabha members from Tamil Nadu
Living people
Dravida Munnetra Kazhagam politicians
Year of birth missing (living people)